Ivan Grigorievich Savenko (January 17, 1924, Varvarovka, Chernigov Province, Ukrainian SSR, USSR – 1987, Leningrad, USSR) was a Soviet painter, Honored Artist of the RSFSR, lived and worked in Leningrad, regarded as one of representatives of the Leningrad school of painting, most famous for his landscape paintings.

Biography 

Ivan Savenko was born January 17, 1924, in Varvarovka village, Chernigov Province, Ukraine, USSR. He was a veteran of World War II, was wounded and lost his right hand, he had many military orders.

In 1950, Savenko graduated from Kiev Art Institute in Grigory Svetlitsky personal art studio.
 
In 1950–1954, Savenko studied as post-graduate student in Ilya Repin Institute in Aleksandr Gerasimov art studio. Master of Art-criticism (1954). Honored Artist of the Russian Federation (1975).

Since 1950, Savenko has participated in art exhibitions. He painted landscapes, portraits, genre scenes, sketches from the life. Personal exhibition in Moscow (1990).

Savenko was a member of Leningrad Union of Artists since 1952.

Savenko died on December 17, 1987, in Leningrad. His paintings reside in State Russian Museum, State Tretyakov Gallery, in art museums and private collections in Russia, France, Ukraine, Germany, Japan, Italy, England, and throughout the world.

References

Bibliography 
 Directory of members of the Leningrad branch of Union of Artists of Russian Federation. - Leningrad: Khudozhnik RSFSR, 1987. - p. 114.
 Saint-Pétersbourg - Pont-Audemer.  Dessins, Gravures, Sculptures et Tableaux du XX siècle du fonds de L' Union des Artistes de Saint-Pétersbourg. - Pont-Audemer: 1994. - p. 92.
 Matthew C. Bown. Dictionary of 20th Century Russian and Soviet Painters 1900-1980s. - London: Izomar, 1998. , .

1924 births
1987 deaths
People from Chernihiv Oblast
Soviet painters
Socialist realist artists
Leningrad School artists
Members of the Leningrad Union of Artists
Repin Institute of Arts alumni
Soviet military personnel of World War II
Recipients of the Order of Glory
Honored Artists of the Russian Federation